Aqdarreh-ye Sofla (also Romanized as Āqdarreh-ye Soflá; also known as Āgh Darreh-ye Soflá) is a village in Ahmadabad Rural District, Takht-e Soleyman District, Takab County, West Azerbaijan Province, Iran. At the 2006 census, its population was 147, in 25 families.

References 

Populated places in Takab County